Vimala Hériau (born 10 February 1999) is a French badminton player who affiliate with Racing Club de France. She was part of the national team that won the gold medal at the 2017 European Junior Championships. She won her first senior international title by winning the women's and mixed doubles event at the 2019 Hellas Open. Hériau was the women's doubles National Champions in 2018 and 2020.

Achievements

BWF International Challenge/Series (2 titles, 7 runners-up) 
Women's doubles

Mixed doubles

  BWF International Challenge tournament
  BWF International Series tournament
  BWF Future Series tournament

References

External links 
 

1999 births
Living people
Sportspeople from Argenteuil
French female badminton players